Última Hora (Spanish for "Last Hour") may refer to several newspapers:

 Última Hora (Bolivia), 1929–2001
 Última Hora (Brazil), 1951–1971
 Última Hora (Nuevo Laredo), Tamaulipas, Mexico, founded in 1996
 Última Hora (Paraguay), founded in 1973
 Última Hora (Spain), in the Balearic Islands, founded in 1893
 Última Hora (Venezuela), a newspaper in Venezuela